K. Alison Clarke-Stewart (born Linda Wilkin, September 23, 1943 – February 23, 2014) was a developmental psychologist and expert on children's social development. She is well known for her work on the effects of child care on children's development, and for her research on children's suggestibility. She has written over 100 articles for scholarly journals and co-authored several leading textbooks in the field.

Early life and education
K. Alison Clarke-Stewart was born and raised in Summerland, British Columbia, Canada. Her childhood years were spent in Summerland and Vancouver. Her father was a high school biology teacher and her mother a homemaker.

Clarke-Stewart earned a Bachelor of Arts degree in psychology and zoology in 1965 and a Master of Arts degree in psychology in 1967, both from the University of British Columbia. She completed her PhD in developmental psychology in 1972 from Yale University, under the guidance of William Kessen.

Career
Clarke-Stewart was a member of the faculty at the University of Chicago from 1975 through 1983. She later joined the faculty at the University of California, Irvine, School of Social Ecology, where she held the titles of research professor and professor emerita of psychology and social behavior. Throughout her career, she authored more than 100 peer-reviewed articles.

Research

Child care
In the early 1970s, Clarke-Stewart began her research on the effects of child care on children, well before it was a central area of inquiry. At the University of Chicago she initiated a longitudinal study of the joint effects of home environments and child care on children's social, emotional and cognitive development which was reported in her 1994 volume, Children at home and in day care. From the outset, she argued that the negative effects of child care are overestimated and dependent on the quality of outside care. In 1990, the National Institute of Child Health and Human Development (NICHD) established their Early Child Care Research Network and Professor Clarke-Stewart became a founding member and a principal investigator. The network consists of ten principal investigators, their co-investigators, and representatives from NICHD and the Data Coordinating and Analysis Center. This network has published over 70 papers, chapters, monographs and edited volumes based on this longitudinal study.

Divorce
She researched issues of child custody and the effects of divorce on families. She co-authored two books on divorce with Cornelia Brentano. The first, Divorce Lessons (2005), is volume aimed at parents and practitioners, with a focus on advice to parents for dealing with the aftermath of divorce. The second, Divorce: Causes and Consequences (2006), is a comprehensive review of the effects of divorce on children, adults, and society.

Eyewitness testimony in children
Clarke-Stewart's focus in this area concerned how suggestibility may influence children's recall of prior events in cases of alleged abuse. In her work, she found that children's recall of a prior encounter with an adult could be distorted by suggestions offered by an interviewer. In related work, she identified child characteristics, such as verbal ability, self-control, and family relationships (such as close ties between child and parent) which may protect children from suggestive questioning. She has also examined jurors' knowledge about the reliability of child witnesses.

Parenting and parent education
Clarke-Stewart studied the effects of variations in parent interaction patterns on children's emotional, social and cognitive development, both concurrently and longitudinally. She also examined parental education and parental advice as vehicles for improving the quality of parenting, as well as historical shifts in child rearing ideas in the United States.

Awards and honors

First Award, Creative Talents Program, American Institutes for Research, 1972.
Fellow, Center for Advanced Study in the Behavioral Sciences, 1982–83.
Fellow, American Psychological Association, 1985.
Visiting Scholar, Wolfson College, Oxford University, 1989.
Fellow, American Psychological Society, 1994.

Selected publications

Books 
Clarke-Stewart, A. & Parke, R. (2014) Social Development (2nd ed.)  Hoboken, N.J.: Wiley

Clarke-Stewart, K. A., & Allhusen, V. (2005). What we know about childcare. Cambridge, MA: Harvard University Press.

Bernstein, D. A., Penner, L. A., Clarke-Stewart, A., & Roy, E. J. (2003, 2006, 2008). Psychology (6th, 7th, 8th editions). Boston: Houghton Mifflin.

Clarke-Stewart, K. A., & Brentano, C. (2006). Divorce: Causes and consequences. New Haven, CT: Yale University Press.

Clarke-Stewart, K. A.,. & Brentano, C. (2005). Divorce lessons: Real-life stories and what you can learn from them. Charleston, SC: BookSurge Publishing.

Clarke-Stewart, K. A., Gruber, C. P., & Fitzgerald, L. M. (1994). Children at home and in day care. Hillsdale NJ: Erlbaum.

Clarke-Stewart, K. A. (1982; 2nd edition 1993). Daycare. Cambridge, MA: Harvard University Press. [Translated into Italian, Spanish, Korean, and Chinese.]

Clarke-Stewart, K. A., & Koch, J. (1983). Children: Development through adolescence. New York: Wiley.

Clarke-Stewart, K. A., Perlmutter, M., & Friedman, S. (1988). Lifelong human development. New York: Wiley.

Clarke-Stewart, K. A., & Friedman, S. (1987). Child development: Infancy through adolescence. New York:: Wiley.

Articles 
Clarke-Stewart, K. A., Vandell, D. L., McCartney, K., Owen, M. T., & Booth, C. (2000). Effects of parental separation and divorce on very young children. Journal of Family Psychology, 14, 304–326.

Clarke-Stewart, K. A., & Hayward, C. (1996). Advantages of father custody and contact for the psychological well-being of school-age children. Journal of Applied Developmental Psychology, 17, 239–270.

Clarke-Stewart, K. A. (1992). Developmental psychology in the real world: A paradigm of parent education. Early Development and Parenting, 1, 5-14.

Clarke-Stewart, K. A., Umeh, B. J., Snow, M. E., & Pederson, J. A. (1980). Development and prediction of children's sociability from 1 to 2 ½ years of age. Developmental Psychology, 16, 290–302.

Clarke-Stewart, K. A., VanderStoep, L., & Killian, G. A. (1979). Analysis and replication of mother-child relations at two years of age. Child Development, 50, 777–793.

Clarke-Stewart, K. A. (1978). And daddy makes three: The father's impact on mother and young child. Child Development, 49, 466–478.

Clarke-Stewart, K. A. (1978). Popular primers for parents. American Psychologist, 33, 359–369.

References

External links

1943 births
2014 deaths
Developmental psychologists
Canadian psychologists
Canadian women psychologists
University of British Columbia alumni
University of California, Irvine faculty
Yale Graduate School of Arts and Sciences alumni
University of Chicago faculty